Round Midnight is a live album by drummer Philly Joe Jones that was recorded at the Pescara Jazz Festival in 1969 and released on the Lotus label in 1980.

Reception

The AllMusic review by Ron Wynn stated: "Excellent Italian set with sorely neglected Dizzy Reece on trumpet."

Track listing
 "That's Earl Brother" (Bud Powell) – 8:44
 "It Don't Mean a Thing" (Duke Ellington) – 9:06
 "Round Midnight" (Thelonious Monk) – 7:15
 "Percy" (Dizzy Reece) – 12:44

Personnel
Philly Joe Jones – drums 
Dizzy Reece – trumpet 
Bent Jædig – tenor saxophone
Larry Vuckovich – piano
Isla Eckinger – bass

References

Philly Joe Jones live albums
1980 live albums